Aristebulea is a genus of moths of the family Crambidae.

Species
Aristebulea nobilis (Moore, 1888)
Aristebulea principis Munroe & Mutuura, 1968

References

Spilomelinae
Crambidae genera
Taxa named by Eugene G. Munroe